The 2007 1000 km of Silverstone was the fifth round of the 2007 Le Mans Series season.  It took place at the Silverstone Circuit, United Kingdom, on 16 September 2007.

Official results
Class winners in bold.  Cars failing to complete 70% of winner's distance are marked as Not Classified (NC).

Statistics
 Pole Position - #7 Team Peugeot Total - 1:31.692
 Fastest Lap - #7 Team Peugeot Total - 1:30.935
 Average Speed - 176.003 km/h

References

External links

 Le Mans Series - 1000 km of Silverstone

S
6 Hours of Silverstone
Silverstone